In the folklore of Lee County, South Carolina, the Lizard Man of Scape Ore Swamp (also known as the Lizard Man of Lee County) is an entity said to inhabit the swampland of the region. First mentioned in the late 1980s, the purported sightings and damage attributed to the creature yielded a significant amount of newspaper, radio and television publicity.

Professor of religious studies Joseph P. Laycock described the media frenzy and subsequent cult appreciation for this and other similar claims as following a predictable "chain of events – a strange sighting, media attention, more sightings, followed by visits from curious tourists and monster hunters." Researcher Ben Radford states that this is a compelling story, "but several important aspects wither under skeptical scrutiny."

History
On July 14, 1988, the Lee County sheriff's office investigated a report of a car damaged overnight while parked at a home in the area of Browntown outside Bishopville, South Carolina, on the edges of the Scape Ore Swamp. The car reportedly had toothmarks and scratches with hair and muddy footprints left behind. Sheriff Liston Truesdale noted this was the start of various claims that eventually coalesced into a story about a lizard man in the swamp. According to Davis, he was driving home from working the night shift at a fast food restaurant when his car got a flat tire. After fixing it, he saw a creature walking toward him. Davis got in his car and began to drive, but the creature was soon on top of the car. He applied his brakes, causing the creature to roll off the car, giving Davis enough time to escape. Coverage by newspapers and media resulted in increased attention for his claims. Local businesses began selling "Lizard Man" T-shirts, and the local chamber of commerce encouraged the media attention as "good for the community".

The increase in newspaper and media publicity prompted further reports of sightings, and the area soon became a tourist attraction for visitors and hunters. Local radio station WCOS offered a $1 million reward to anybody who could capture the creature alive. On August 5, Kenneth Orr, an airman stationed at Shaw Air Force Base, filed a police report alleging that he had encountered the Lizard Man on Highway 15, and he had shot and wounded it. He presented several scales and a small quantity of blood as evidence. Orr recanted this account two days later when he was arraigned for unlawfully carrying a pistol and the misdemeanor offense of filing a false police report. According to Orr, he had hoaxed the sighting in order to keep stories about the Lizard Man in circulation. Reports of the creature gradually declined at the end of the summer. Local law enforcement officials speculated that the sightings were likely to have been a bear.

In 2008, CNN mentioned the Lizard Man legend in a story about a couple in Bishopville who reported damage to their vehicle, including blood traces. The blood traces were subsequently found to be from a domestic dog, though the local sheriff suggested it might have been a coyote or wolf. In 2015, local television station WCIV featured photos and videos claimed to be Lizard Man, allegedly taken by Jim Wilson and other unidentified individuals. In August 2017, the South Carolina Emergency Management Division sent a humorous tweet "regarding possible paranormal activity" during the solar eclipse that passed over the area, hinting that people of Lee and Sumter counties should "remain vigilant" for sightings of the Lizard Man.

Criticism
Skeptical investigator Ben Radford states that the details of Chris Davis's story do not hold up under scrutiny. Sheriff Truesdale stated that Davis's story never wavered, but Radford writes that isn't true.

Over weeks and months and repeated tellings, the details changed many times, from having scales to the "creature being packed with mud", how far away Davis was from the creature when he first saw it, and whether or not it attacked the car. Radford questioned how Davis was able to see details of the Lizard Man creature at 2am when there was no lighting nearby in a heavily wooded area when the moon was not bright. If this was an aggressive creature, why were there no other credible sightings? According to Radford, the timing of Davis' story didn't make sense. If Davis saw the creature in the shadows while he was closing the trunk of his car, Davis still had to get back in the car and take off, yet Davis claims that the creature was so fast that it caught up to the car when he was doing . Reports vary with the source that Davis told the police about the attack two or more weeks later.

After investigating, Radford states that the polygraph test administered to Davis may have been a "publicity stunt" by Southern Marketing, Inc., a company "arrange(ing) personal appearances for Davis". Another curious issue was that there are no photographs of the damage to Davis's car which provide some evidence that something happened. Newspaper accounts give various descriptions of the damage to the car, and in one local newspaper Davis is quoted as saying "he escaped with no more than a scratch on his fender". Radford states that Davis's report "is quite literally incredible, riddled with both implausibilities and impossibilities. It may be sincere or it may be a hoax, but in either event no hard evidence of the creature has been found."

Media

In 2010, the TV program Destination Truth featured the legendary creature.  Children's books such as Maniacal Monsters and Bizarre Beasts include the monster in their bestiaries. Linda Godfrey's 2014 book American Monsters: A History of Monster Lore, Legends, and Sightings in America includes a chapter on the lizard man, and Cryptozoologist Lyle Blackburn's 2013 book Lizard Man: The True Story of the Bishopville Monster details the entire history of the creature. The lizard man has also appeared on the SYFY show Fact or Faked in an episode titled "Reptile Rampage".

The original contemporaneous story ran in more than 100 newspapers across the country.

See also
 List of reptilian humanoids
 Loveland frog
 Thetis Lake Monster

References

External links
Bishopville Lizardman Festival
SC Office of Tourism "Beware the Lizard Man"

American legendary creatures
Lee County, South Carolina
South Carolina folklore